Carlo Asinari (3 November 1884 – 2 February 1953) was an Italian show jumping rider, that won a bronze medal at the Olympic Games. He was born in Pisa and died in Turin.

Biography
Asinari participated in the 1920 Summer Olympics.

Achievements

References

External links
 
 
 Italian Olympians ARP-ATZ: "ASINARI Conte di SAN MARZANO, Cap. Carlo" 

1884 births
1953 deaths
Italian show jumping riders
Olympic equestrians of Italy
Italian male equestrians
Olympic bronze medalists for Italy
Equestrians at the 1920 Summer Olympics
Medalists at the 1920 Summer Olympics